Marie Charlotte Wiehe-Berény (Hansen), born August 28th 1865 in Copenhagen - September 4th 1947 in Skodsborg, was a Danish actor, ballet dancer and singer.

Life and family

She was born to Emma Cathinka Hansen (born Flor), aged 33, and Jacob Julius Georg Hansen, aged 39. She had seven other siblings and her father died when Charlotte was just 3 years old. Her mother single handedly raised the eight children and ran a hat shop.

Her first marriage was to silent actor Wilhelm Wiehe (born 10 February 1858-18 August 1916.) They married 5 June 1889. Their marriage lasted 10 years and they had a son named Bent Wiehe (born 11 November 1895) however when Charlotte remarried later, his name was changed to Bent Wiehe Berény.

Her second marriage was to Hungarian violinist and composer Henri Berény (born 1 January 1871-22 March 1932.) They married 7 December 1899 in Copenhagen, Denmark and moved to Paris a year later. The marriage was terminated in 1920 but on 6 August 1929, they remarried at Copenhagen City Hall.

During the First World War, the couple's wealth was seized by the French authorities as Henri Berény was Hungarian. 

Charlotte only returned to Denmark after Berény's death where she remained relatively poor but still appeared on stage.

In 1929 she wrote her memoirs, 'From Old Coin to the Great World.'

She died 4 September 1947 in Skodsburg where she is buried at Assistens Cemetery with her parents and two brothers.

Career

Charlotte was admitted to the Royal Danish Theatre in 1874 where she trained as a ballet dancer and took roles in August Bournonville's works. Then from 1881-1890 she was employed by the Theatre.

However in 1890, after failing to be promoted as a ballerina, she turned to acting. She performed in operettas and comedies at Copenhagen's Folketeatret and Casino becoming one of the favourites of her day. 

Then after she married Henri Berény, they moved to Paris and Charlotte embarked on an international career in theatre and silent films where she toured Europe and America. Her films included The Hand, The Doll Man, Bankerot and Lotte vil paa Landet

In 1940, she received Ingenio et arti

References

20th-century Danish ballet dancers
1865 births
1947 deaths
19th-century Danish ballet dancers
20th-century Danish actresses
Actresses from Copenhagen